High Bias is the sixth studio album by Purling Hiss, released on October 14, 2016, by Drag City.

Track listing

Personnel
Adapted from the High Bias liner notes.

Purling Hiss
 Ben Hart – drums
 Mike Polizze – vocals, electric guitar
 Dan Provenzano – bass guitar

Production and additional personnel
 Paul Gold – mastering
 Kathryn Lipman – photography
 Dallas Simpson – cover art
 Jeff Zeigier – engineering

Release history

References

External links 
 High Bias at Bandcamp
 

2016 albums
Purling Hiss albums
Drag City (record label) albums